The following highways are numbered 728:

Canada

Costa Rica
 National Route 728

United States